Boodanoo Station is a pastoral lease that was once a sheep station but now operates as a cattle station in Western Australia.

It was established some time prior to 1908; the owner in 1909 was S.R.L Elliot, who had been there for the last 12 months. Elliot sold the  holding to R. Lejeune and Vernon Sewell, who owned Sandsprings Station. The pair intended to stock the property immediately. In 1910 Boodanoo was stocked with approximately 4,000 sheep. By 1916 the flock was 5,500 sheep and 6,000 in 1919.

Lejeune was accidentally shot and killed by a kangaroo shooter in 1931. The shooter had shot a kangaroo but the bullet passed through the animal and travelled an additional  through the mulga scrub before hitting Lejeune.

In 1946 the lease was split into Boodanoo North and Boodanoo South, with both properties being placed on the market. Boodanoo North comprised  with  fenced into 10 paddocks. The property had 15 windmills and an 8-roomed homestead. Boodanoo North comprised  with  fenced into 12 paddocks.

Julie and Robert Broadhurst purchased Boodanoo and Narndee Stations in 2015.

See also
List of ranches and stations
List of pastoral leases in Western Australia

References

Pastoral leases in Western Australia
Stations (Australian agriculture)
Homesteads in Western Australia
Mid West (Western Australia)